Dugand's blind snake (Trilepida dugandi) is a species of snake in the family Leptotyphlopidae. The species is endemic to South America.

Etymology
The specific name, dugandi, is in honor of Colombian naturalist Armando Dugand.

Geographic range
T. dugandi is found in Atlántico Department, Colombia.

Habitat

Description
Dorsally, T. dugandi is brown with seven dark copper stripes. Ventrally, it is cream-colored.

Reproduction
T. dugandi is oviparous.

References

Further reading
Adalsteinsson SA, Branch WR, Trape S, Vitt LJ, Hedges SB (2009). "Molecular phylogeny, classification, and biogeography of snakes of the Family Leptotyphlopidae (Reptilia, Squamata)". Zootaxa 2244: 1-50. (Tricheilostoma dugandi, new combination).
Dunn ER (1944). "A Review of the Colombian Snakes of the Families Typhlopidae and Leptotyphlopidae". Caldasia 3 (11): 47–55. (Leptotyphlops dugandi, new species, pp. 52–53).
Hedges SB (2011). "The type species of the threadsnake genus Tricheilostoma Jan revisited (Squamata, Leptotyphlopidae)". Zootaxa 3027: 63–64. (Trilepida dugandi, new combination).

Trilepida
Reptiles of Colombia
Reptiles described in 1944